Jerry's Artarama is an originator of discount art supplies and materials company currently based in North Carolina, United States. The art materials it provides include fine artist paints, canvas and boards, brushes and palette knives, easels, frames as well as extensive custom canvas and frame departments.

Overview
Jerry's Artarama was founded in 1968 by Jerry Goldstein in Long Island, New York, the first to introduce art supplies at discount prices to artists in the local community. He had been managing a toy store in Long Island, before he started the art supply shop. In addition to art materials and supplies, Jerry's Artarama also arranges instructional workshops, release free online video art lessons, new art supply demos and arranges special art related events across the country. They also sponsor art scholarships for student artists in universities and colleges. At present the company offers around 70,000 art materials from various art manufacturers, as well as their own product lines via an online retail store, art supply catalog and superstores. The corporate headquarters of the company is located in Raleigh, North Carolina.

See also
 Utrecht Art Supply
 Blick Art Materials
 Michaels

References

Companies based in Raleigh, North Carolina
American companies established in 1968
Retail companies established in 1968
Retail companies of the United States